Ksingmul (Xing Mul) may be,

Ksingmul people
Ksingmul language